Carner is a surname. Notable people with the surname include:

Jaime Carner (1867–1934), Spanish lawyer, businessman and politician
Joan Reventós i Carner (born 1927), the 10th President of the Parliament of Catalonia (1995–1999)
JoAnne Carner (born 1939), former American professional golfer
Josep Carner (1884–1970), Spanish Catalan poet, journalist, playwright and translator
Mosco Carner (1904–1985), British musicologist of Austrian birth

Fictional characters:
Rocco Carner, fictional character from the American soap opera The Bold and the Beautiful, portrayed by Bryan Genesse

See also
Carner and Gregor, American musical theatre writing team